Melanohalea elegantula, commonly known as the elegant camouflage lichen, is a species of lichen in the family Parmeliaceae. It was first described by Alexander Zahlbruckner in 1894 as Parmelia aspidota var. elegantula. Hungarian lichenologist Ödön Szatala promoted it to full species status, as Parmelia elegantula, in 1930. Ted Esslinger transferred it to the genus Melanelia in 1978. Finally, it was assigned to the newly circumscribed genus Melanohalea in 2004.

References

elegantula
Lichen species
Lichens described in 1894
Lichens of Europe
Lichens of North America
Taxa named by Alexander Zahlbruckner